, formal name Suigetsu-in Gyoran-ji (水月院魚藍寺), is a Buddhist temple in 4 Mita, Minato, Tokyo, Japan.
It is located in the mountain side of Tsuki no Misaki.

Origin of the name
The name was chosen because the principal image is Gyoran Kanzeon Bosatsu (魚藍観世音菩薩), whose figure is a maiden with her hair tied  in a Chinese style topknot (唐様).

The following is a Chinese tale of the time of the Tang dynasty. The Buddha appeared in a beautiful maiden's figure, selling fish in a bamboo basket, and spread Buddhism. The sculpture was made based on this story.

See also
 Glossary of Japanese Buddhism.

References

Buildings and structures in Minato, Tokyo
Buddhist temples in Tokyo